Friday Night Dinner is a 
British television sitcom written by Robert Popper and starring Tamsin Greig, Paul Ritter, Simon Bird, Tom Rosenthal, and Mark Heap. The comedy is focused on the regular dinner experience of the middle-class British Jewish Goodman family every Friday night. The series aired from 2011 to 2020 on Channel 4. Following the conclusion of the sixth series and Paul Ritter's death in 2021, it was announced that the show would not return.

The show received two BAFTA nominations in 2012. The first series was nominated for Best Situation Comedy, while Greig was nominated for Best Female Comedy Performance. In 2021, for his performance in the final series of the show, Ritter received a posthumous BAFTA nomination for Best Male Comedy Performance.

Premise
Friday Night Dinner depicts Shabbat dinner in the middle-class secular Jewish Goodman family, reflecting writer and producer Robert Popper's own secular Jewish upbringing. It is set in suburban North London, and filmed there, in Mill Hill. 

The family consists of mother Jackie (Tamsin Greig), father Martin (Paul Ritter), elder son and musician Adam (Simon Bird), and younger son and estate agent Jonny (Tom Rosenthal). The episodes follow the family as the sons arrive at the family home and proceed to their dinner, which is often interrupted by numerous things. Although some episodes are centred around Jackie’s eccentricities, she is usually the straight character who tries to run a normal household, but is disrupted by the rest of the family. Most frequently, dinner is disrupted by Adam and Jonny pranking each other, for example by putting salt in each other's water glasses, or Martin's oddities – including walking around the house topless or eating out-of-date food and saying his catchphrase "shit on it". They are frequently interrupted by their strange but good-hearted neighbour Jim Bell (Mark Heap), who is attracted to Jackie and visits them due to his loneliness, in most cases accompanied by his dog, Wilson, of whom he is afraid. After Wilson's death at the end of series 5, Jim adopts a new dog who he names Milson.

Jackie's neurotic best friend, Valerie Lewis (Tracy-Ann Oberman), known as "Auntie Val" to Adam and Jonny, is a frequent visitor, as was Jackie's mother, Nellie Buller (Frances Cuka). Occasional guest appearances were made by Martin's mother, Cynthia Goodman (Rosalind Knight), referred to as Horrible Grandma due her cruel and condescending treatment of the Goodmans. Other guest appearances featured Nellie's suitor Mr Morris (Harry Landis) who appeared in three episodes while Valerie's husband, Larry (Steve Furst) briefly appears in two.

Cast

Main

Recurring

Guest

Episode list

Legacy 
For the 10th anniversary of the show, a special 90-minute documentary episode aired on Channel 4 on 28 May 2021, entitled Friday Night Dinner: Ten Years and A Lovely Bit of Squirrel. The documentary was dedicated to Paul Ritter, who had died seven weeks earlier.

American version
In September 2011, Deadline Hollywood announced that Greg Daniels, who had adapted The Office for American television, would spearhead an American remake of the series for the broadcast network NBC. The remake was picked up for a pilot, written by Daniels and directed by Ken Kwapis and starring Allison Janney and Tony Shalhoub as the parents. The pilot did not go to series.

In 2014, CBS bought an adaptation of the British show for the American market, as a "put pilot".

In 2016, a third attempt at an American remake was under development by CBS, with the title Sunday Night Dinner.

In 2022, Amazon Freevee ordered an American remake, with the title Dinner with The Parents.

See also
 List of Friday Night Dinner episodes

References

External links
 
 
 
 

2011 British television series debuts
2020 British television series endings
2010s British black comedy television series
2020s British black comedy television series
2010s British sitcoms
2020s British sitcoms
Channel 4 sitcoms
English-language television shows
Jewish comedy and humor
Television series about brothers
Television series about dysfunctional families
Television series about Jews and Judaism
Television series about marriage
Television series by Big Talk Productions
Television shows set in London